Builth Wells Urban District, in Brecknockshire, was an urban district between 1894 and 1974. It was succeeded by Brecknock.

Further information, including details of the archives here .

Urban districts of Wales
Brecknockshire